The SPAD S.XIII is a French biplane fighter aircraft of the First World War, developed by Société Pour L'Aviation et ses Dérivés (SPAD) from the earlier and highly successful SPAD S.VII.

During early 1917, the French designer Louis Béchereau, spurred by the approaching obsolescence of the S.VII, decided to develop two new fighter aircraft, the S.XII and the S.XIII, both using a powerful new geared version of the successful Hispano-Suiza 8A engine. The cannon armament of the S.XII was unpopular with most pilots, but the S.XIII proved to be one of the most capable fighters of the war, as well as one of the most-produced, with 8,472 built and orders for around 10,000 more cancelled at the Armistice.

By the end of the First World War, the S.XIII had equipped virtually every fighter squadron of the Aéronautique Militaire. In addition, the United States Army Air Service also procured the type in bulk during the conflict, and some replaced or supplemented S.VIIs in the Royal Flying Corps (RFC), pending the arrival of Sopwith Dolphins. It proved popular with its pilots; numerous aces from various nations flew the S.XIII during their flying careers. Following the signing of the Armistice of 11 November 1918, which effectively marked the end of the First World War, surplus S.XIIIs were sold in great numbers to both civil and military operators throughout the world.

Development

Background
The origins of the SPAD S.XIII lies in the performance of its predecessor, the SPAD S.VII, a single-seat fighter aircraft powered by a  direct drive Hispano-Suiza 8A water-cooled V-8 engine and armed with a single synchronised Vickers machine gun. The type demonstrated excellent performance for the time, entering operational service with the French Aéronautique Militaire during August 1916. By early 1917, however, the S.VII had been surpassed by the latest German fighters such as the Albatros D.I.

The emergence of increasingly capable German fighters, which soon resulted in a shift in aerial supremacy towards the Central Powers, led to calls for superior aircraft to be developed and procured. French flying ace Georges Guynemer personally lobbied for an improved version of the S.VII, telling the SPAD designer Louis Béchereau that "The 150 hp SPAD is not a match for the Halberstadt ... More speed is needed."

Spanish manufacturer Hispano-Suiza were already in the process of developing a more powerful geared version of the 8A engine, and this engine was unsurprisingly chosen by Béchereau to power two developed versions of the S.VII. The British S.E.5a and Sopwith Dolphin fighters would also be powered by the same engine.

Intro flight
The first of Béchereau's designs to fly with the new, gear-reduction HS.8B engine design series was the S.XII in its HS.8BeC (or "HS-38") version, which was armed with an unusual  cannon that fired through the propeller shaft. However, this aircraft only saw limited use, having been rapidly followed into production by the more conventionally armed S.XIII, which was deemed to be a preferable configuration by several French pilots and officials. Aviation author C.F. Andrews has claimed that a large portion of the credit for the S.XIII lies with Marc Birkigt, the designer of the engine, who had chosen to introduce various innovative features upon it, such as monobloc aluminium cylinders, which were furnished with screwed-in steel liners, which improved its performance.

On 4 April 1917, the SPAD S.XIII performed its maiden flight. An early distinguishing feature of the S.XIII - as with the SPAD S.XII - was that its similarly-geared HS.8Be V8 engine mandated a left-handed propeller rotating in the opposite rotation to the earlier, direct-drive HS.8A-powered S.VII. Early on, similarly to the British Sopwith Dolphin also powered with HS.8B-series geared V8s, problems were encountered with the HS.8B engine's gearing; however, Béchereau opted to persist with the engine, which was soon refined and became fairly reliable. Efforts to ramp up production of the type commenced almost immediately after the first flight was conducted. Within months of its first flight, the S.XIII had not only entered service with the Aéronautique Militaire but had quickly proven itself to be a successful fighter.

Design
The SPAD S.XIII was a single-engine biplane fighter aircraft. In terms of its construction, it shared a similar configuration and layout to the earlier S.VII, featuring a mainly wooden structure complete with a fabric covering; however, it was generally larger and heavier than its predecessor. Other changes included the tapered chord of its ailerons, the rounded tips of the tailplanes, bulkier cowling accommodating the gear-drive Hispano-Suiza 8B engine choice, and enlarged fin and rudder. The S.XIII was armed with a pair of forward-mounted Vickers machine guns with 400 rounds per gun, which took the place of the single gun that had been used on the earlier aircraft.

The S.XIII featured relatively conventional construction, that being a wire-braced biplane with a box-shaped fuselage and a front-mounted engine, except for its interposed wing struts located half-way along the wing span, which gave the fighter the deceptive appearance of being a double-bay aircraft instead of a single bay. This change prevented the landing brace wires from whipping and chafing during flight, and was attributed by Andrews as a key factor for the aircraft's high rate of climb. Otherwise, it had an orthodox structure, comprising wooden members attached to metal joint fixtures. The fuselage consisted of four square-section longerons, complete with wooden struts and cross-members while braced with heavy-gauge piano wire; wire cable was instead used for the flying and landing wires.

To facilitate its two-hour endurance, the S.XIII was furnished with an assortment of underbelly fuel tanks held within the forward fuselage area; these were fed into the main service tank located in the center of the upper wing by an engine-driven pump. Similar pumps were used for supplying pressurised oil and water circulation between the engine's radiator and a header tank was housed within the upper wing. The circular nose radiator incorporated vertical Venetian-style blinds as a means of regulating the temperature of the engine.

The upper wing was a single-piece structure, featuring hollow box-section short spars which connected with linen-bandaged scarf joints, Andrews claims that long runs of spruce were difficult to obtain. The ribs consisted of plywood webs and spruce capping strips, which were internally braced with piano wire. The upper wing was provisioned with ailerons, which were actuated by the pilot via a series of tubular pushrods which ran vertical directly beneath the ailerons, with external, 90º bellcranks exposed above the lower wing panels' top fabric covering. The lower wing consisted of spruce leading edges and wire-cable trailing edges, while the surfaces were fabric-covered and treated with aircraft dope to produce a scalloped effect, much as with the contemporary German Fokker D.VII that also used a wire trailing-edge component, along the trailing edges.

While the forward Vickers machine guns were installed as standard, they were not always present upon all aircraft. As a result of fears of a shortage of Vickers guns during the last few months of the war, several American squadrons equipped with the S.XIII decided to replace their existing Vickers .303 machine guns with the lighter (25 lbs/11.34 kg apiece) .30/06-calibre Marlin Rockwell M1917 and M1918 aircraft machine guns, saving some sixteen pounds (7.3 kg) in weight over the twin-mount Vickers' total weight of 66 lbs (29.94 kg) for the guns alone. Reportedly, by the end of the war, roughly one half of the aircraft in American service had been converted in this fashion.

The powerplant of the S.XIII was a geared Hispano-Suiza engine, at first a 8Ba providing , but in later aircraft a high-compression 8Bc or 8Be delivering  was often used. The sum of these improvements was a notable improvement in flight and combat performance. It was faster than its main contemporaries, the British Sopwith Camel and the German Fokker D.VII and its relatively higher power-to-weight ratio gave it a good rate of climb. The SPAD was renowned for its speed and strength in a dive, although the maneuverability of the type was relatively poor and the aircraft was difficult to control at low speeds: needing to be landed with power on, unlike contemporary fighters like the Royal Aircraft Factory SE.5 which could be landed with power off.

While giving the Spad XIII outstanding performance, the geared engines proved to be unreliable, suffering from vibration and poor lubrication. This significantly and severely affected serviceability, with it being stated in November 1917 that the Spad S.XIII was "incapable of giving dependable service". Even in April 1918, an official report stated that two-thirds of the 200 hp SPADs were out of use at any one time due to engine problems. At least one American observer believed at the time that the French were giving the US SPAD XIII squadrons lower-quality engines from their least favored manufacturers while keeping the best for themselves. Allegedly, the reliability issues encountered with the engine were considered an acceptable price to pay for the improved performance, however, as time went by, a combination of improved build quality and changes to the engine design led to increased levels of serviceability.

At the beginning of 1918 the Aviation Militaire issued a requirement for a more powerful fighter, in a C1 (Chasseur single-seat) specification. SPAD responded by fitting the  Hispano-Suiza 8Fb in the SPAD XIII airframe. The structure was strengthened and improved aero-dynamically, retaining the dimensions of the SPAD XIII. Twenty SPAD XVII fighters were built and issued to units with GC 12 (Les Cigones).

Operational history
 
During May 1917, only one month following the type's maiden flight, deliveries to the  commenced. The new aircraft quickly became an important element in the French plans for its fighter force, being expected to replace the SPAD S.VII as well as the few remaining Nieuport fighters in front line service. However, these plans were disrupted by deliveries occurring at a much slower rate than had been initially forecast; by the end of March 1918, 764 fighters had been delivered compared with a planned force of 2,230.

Eventually, the S.XIII equipped virtually every French fighter squadron, 74 escadrilles, during the First World War. At the end of the war, plans were underway to replace the S.XIII with several fighter types powered by the  Hispano-Suiza 8F, such as the Nieuport-Delage NiD 29, the SPAD S.XX and the Sopwith Dolphin II. These plans lapsed following the signing of the Armistice of 11 November 1918, which ended the First World War and the SPAD S.XIII remained in French service as a fighter aircraft until 1923.

The S.XIII was flown by numerous famous French fighter pilots such as Rene Fonck (the highest scoring Allied ace, credited with 75 victories), Georges Guynemer (54 victories), and Charles Nungesser (45 victories), and also by the leading Italian ace Francesco Baracca (34 victories). Aces of the United States Army Air Service who flew the S.XIII include Eddie Rickenbacker (America's leading First World War ace with 26 confirmed victories) and Frank Luke (18 victories). Andrews attributes the S.XIII's natural stability, which lent itself to being a steady gun platform, as having been a key attribute for its success.

USAAS
Other Allied forces were quick to adopt the new fighter as well; the SPAD XIII equipped 15 of the 16 operational American pursuit squadrons of the USAAS by the signing of the Armistice. Even prior to America's entry into the conflict, American volunteers flying with the Allies had been piloting the type. Nearly half of the 893 purchased by the United States were still in service by 1920. In the United States, some S.XIIIs were re-engined with 180 hp Wright-Hispano engines to improve reliability and to prepare pilots for the new Thomas-Morse MB-3 fighter (which used SPAD-type wings in its construction) in 1922; according to Andrews, the Wright-Hispano engine was incapable of matching the performance of the original powerplant.

RFC
During December 1917, No 23 Squadron of the Royal Flying Corps (RFC) equipped with the SPAD S.XIII, retaining them until April 1918 when it re-equipped with the Dolphin, while No. 19 Squadron (officially equipped with the earlier S.VII) also operated at least a single S.XIII for a time. It was alleged by Andrews that the type was sometimes used as an interim fighter while awaiting the delivery of British-built aircraft.

In his memoir Sagittarius Rising, Cecil Lewis described an aerial competition between himself and a SPAD flown by Guynemer, while Lewis was flying an SE5, "Their speeds were almost identical, but the high-compression Spad climbed quicker. After the race was over, Guynemeyer and I held a demonstration combat over the aerodrome. Again I was badly worsted. Guynemeyer was all over me. In his hands the Spad was a marvel of flexibility. In the first minute I should have been shot down a dozen times".

Corpo Aeronautico Militare
The S.XIII was also acquired by Italy for the Corpo Aeronautico Militare. Andrews has claimed that Italian pilots expressed an overall preference for another French-built fighter, the Hanriot HD.1, which was more maneuverable but considerably less powerful in comparison. Belgium also operated the S.XIII; one Belgian ace, Edmond Thieffry, came to prominence while piloting the type. After the end of the war, the S.XIII was also exported to further nations, including Japan, Poland and Czechoslovakia.

Gallery

Operators

 Argentine Air Force – Two aircraft.

 Groupe de Chasse
 10me Escadrille de Chasse

 Aviação Militar do Exército Brasileiro (Brazilian Army Aviation) - 1920 to 1930

 Czech Air Force – Postwar.

Aéronautique Militaire
 Escadrille 3
 Escadrille 12
 Escadrille 15
 Escadrille 16
 Escadrille 23
 Escadrille 26
 Escadrille 31
 Escadrille 37
 Escadrille 38
 Escadrille 48
 Escadrille 49
 Escadrille 57
 Escadrille 62
 Escadrille 65
 Escadrille 67
 Escadrille 68
 Escadrille 69
 Escadrille 73
 Escadrille 75
 Escadrille 76
 Escadrille 77
 Escadrille 78
 Escadrille 79
 Escadrille 80
 Escadrille 81
 Escadrille 82
 Escadrille 83
 Escadrille 84
 Escadrille 85
 Escadrille 86
 Escadrille 87
 Escadrille 88
 Escadrille 89
 Escadrille 90
 Escadrille 91
 Escadrille 92
 Escadrille 93
 Escadrille 94
 Escadrille 95
 Escadrille 96
 Escadrille 97
 Escadrille 98
 Escadrille 99
 Escadrille 100
 Escadrille 102
 Escadrille 103
 Escadrille 112
 Escadrille 124 better known as the Lafayette Escadrille
 Escadrille SPA.124 (Jeanne d'Arc)
 Escadrille 150
 Escadrille 151
 Escadrille 152
 Escadrille 153
 Escadrille 154
 Escadrille 155
 Escadrille 156
 Escadrille 157
 Escadrille 158
 Escadrille 159
 Escadrille 160
 Escadrille 161
 Escadrille 162
 Escadrille 163
 Escadrille 164
 Escadrille 165
 Escadrille 166
 Escadrille 167
 Escadrille 168
 Escadrille 169
 Escadrille 170
 Escadrille 171
 Escadrille 173
 Escadrille 175
 Escadrille 313
 Escadrille 314
 Escadrille 315
 Escadrille 412
 Escadrille 442
 Escadrille 461
 Escadrille 462
 Escadrille 463
 Escadrille 464
 Escadrille 466
 Escadrille 467
 Escadrille 469
 Escadrille 470
 Escadrille 471
 Escadrille 472
 Escadrille 506
 Escadrille 507
 Escadrille 523
 Escadrille 531
 Escadrille 561
 Escadrille Lafayette
 Aéronautique Navale

 Hellenic Air Force

 Corpo Aeronautico Militare

 Imperial Japanese Army Air Service
 Second Polish Republic
 Polish Air Force (Postwar)

Romanian Air Corps (Postwar)

 Imperial Russian Air Service

 Serbian Air Force

 Soviet Air Force – Taken over from the Imperial Russian Air Force.
 Siam
Royal Siamese Aeronautical Service
 Kingdom of Spain
 Spanish Air Force

 Turkish Air Force
 United Kingdom
 Royal Flying Corps
 No. 19 Squadron RFC – One aircraft
 No. 23 Squadron RFC – December 1917 – May 1918.

 United States Army Air Service
 13th Aero Squadron
 22nd Aero Squadron
 27th Aero Squadron
 28th Aero Squadron
 49th Aero Squadron
 93d Aero Squadron
 94th Aero Squadron
 95th Aero Squadron
 103rd Aero Squadron
 139th Aero Squadron
 141st Aero Squadron
 147th Aero Squadron
 213th Aero Squadron

 Uruguayan Air Force

Surviving aircraft

Belgium
 SP49 – on static display at the Royal Museum of the Armed Forces and Military History in Brussels.

France
 S4377 – airworthy with the Memorial Flight Association in La Ferté-Alais, Île-de-France.
 S5295/S15295 – on static display at the Musée de l’air et de l’espace in Paris, Île-de-France.

United States
 S7689 Smith IV – on static display at the National Air and Space Museum in Washington, D.C.
 S16594 – on static display at the National Museum of the United States Air Force in Dayton, Ohio. It is painted to represent Eddie Rickenbacker's aircraft.
 S15155 – on static display at Phoenix Sky Harbor International Airport in Phoenix, Arizona. Includes parts from three different aircraft and is painted to represent a SPAD XIII flown by Frank Luke.

Specifications (SPAD S.XIII)

See also

References

Notes

Citations

Bibliography
 Andrews, C.F. Profile No 17: The SPAD XIII C.1. Leatherhead, Surrey, UK: Profile Publications, 1965.
 Bruce, J.M. The Aeroplanes of the Royal Flying Corps (Military Wing). London: Putnam, 1982. .
 Bruce, J.M. "The First Fighting SPADs". Air Enthusiast, Issue 15, April–July 1981, pp. 58–77. Bromley, Kent: Pilot Press. ISSN 0143-5450.
 Bruce, J.M. "Spad Story: Part One". Air International, Vol. 10, No. 5, May 1976, pp. 237–242. Bromley, UK: Fine Scroll.
 Bruce, J.M. "Spad Story: Part Two". Air International, Vol. 10, No. 6, June 1976, pp. 289–296, 310–312. Bromley, UK: Fine Scroll.
 Bruce, J.M., Michael P. Rolfe and Richard Ward. AircamAviation Series No 9: Spad Scouts SVII–SXIII. Canterbury, UK: Osprey, 1968. .

 

 Maurer, Maurer, ed. The U.S. Air Service in World War I: Volume I: The Final Report and a Tactical History. Washington, D.C.: The Office of Air Force History, USAF, 1978.
 Sharpe, Michael. Biplanes, Triplanes, and Seaplanes. London: Friedman/Fairfax Books, 2000. .
 Winchester, Jim. Fighter: The World's Finest Combat Aircraft – 1913 to the Present Day. New York: Barnes & Noble Publishing, Inc. and Parragon Publishing, 2006. .

External links

 Air Force Association Fact Sheet (pdf)
 Spad S. XIII shown in Belgique maximum card
 Spad XIII in the United States Air Service with pursuit group histories
 The NMUSAF's SPAD S.XIII Page

1910s French fighter aircraft
Military aircraft of World War I
S.XIII
Aircraft first flown in 1917
Biplanes
Single-engined tractor aircraft